The Verlag Europa-Lehrmittel Nourney, Vollmer GmbH & Co. KG (English: European educational media), based in Haan (district Gruiten) near Düsseldorf, Germany, develops educational media for vocational training and further education as used in vocational schools, universities, companies and further education institutions for industrial-technical, business, social, health as well as gastronomic professions. The contents are delivered in print as well as in digital formats, including offered as apps, simulations, software and through an exam preparation portal.

General partner is Nourney, Vollmer & Co. GmbH, a school and specialist book publisher.

History
The publishing house was founded in Wuppertal in 1948, when the first books were published. In Eislingen/Fils a construction office was set up to create the technical drawings for the textbooks - today the drawing office of the publisher in Ostfildern. A little over 40 years later, in 1989, a new company building was built in Haan-Gruiten.

Further program expansions in vocational training were realized by adding titles of the publishing houses Lau, Gerber, Pluspunkt, parts of the  program and that of the Gildebuchverlag.

In 2013, the scientific and technical university titles of Verlag Harri Deutsch were taken over, including the bestselling "Handbook of Mathematics" by Ilya Nikolaevich Bronstein and Konstantin Adolfovic Semendyayev. In addition, Europa-Lehrmittel's first exam apps appeared.

In 2017, the publisher introduced its own digital learning platform named Europathek. The  (English: Examination Doc) platform, which enables targeted online preparation for exams, went online the same year.

In 2018, the titles of the Düsseldorf publishing house SOL for self-organized learning were incorporated into Europa-Lehrmittel's program.

Program
The program meanwhile includes well over 2000 print and digital publications, including specialist titles on metal technology, automotive and electrical engineering (like "" (English: Metal Book of Tables)), on business administration, as well as works for the gastronomic profession (e.g. "" (English: The Young Cook)).

Many titles also appear as licensed editions in over 20 different languages ​​on all continents.

All contents are presented in an annual catalog, on the website, in schools, in companies, and at trade fairs and congresses.

Digital educational media
: In addition to digital books,  also provides media packages, additional materials and e-learning contents. The online contents of the 'media shelf' can be used per web browser. There are also software versions and apps for offline use, with the help of which the obtained titles can be viewed after downloading.

 (English: Examination Doc):  offers web-based learning, practice and repetition to prepare for the intermediate and final examinations. This includes simulations of the exams with direct evaluation of the results.

References

External links 

 Publisher website
 Prüfungsdoc: Online courses for exam preparation
 Europathek: 'Digital media' shelf

1948 establishments
Book publishing companies of Germany
Educational book publishing companies
Textbook publishing companies
Digital media